Square D is an American manufacturer of electrical equipment headquartered in Andover, Massachusetts. Square D is a flagship brand of Schneider Electric, which acquired Square D in 1991.

The company was listed on the New York Stock Exchange for 55 years prior to its acquisition without reporting financial loss in any calendar quarter, paying out 220 consecutive quarterly dividends to shareholders.

History 

The company was founded on December 15, 1902 by Bryson Dexter Horton and James B. McCarthy. In 1903 they incorporated as the McBride Manufacturing Company. During the first decade of business, the company expanded into various other electrical products. In 1908, the company was renamed Detroit Fuse and Manufacturing. Horton, an 1895 electrical engineering graduate of the University of Michigan, was credited with the invention of the safety switch, which encased high voltage switches and started the company's main line of business of circuit breakers and encased control panels. Their first enclosed safety switch was introduced in 1909.

Soon after their renaming to Detroit Fuse and Manufacturing, the company adopted their famous logo — a capital "letter D" for Detroit, enclosed in a square. The logo was stamped on all Square D's switches and products. The combination of an easily remembered monogram logo and their great popularity resulted in customers referring to their products as "Square D". Consequently, the company trademarked the logo and in 1917 they renamed the company Square D. Horton served as Square D's president until 1928

In the early 1920s Square D sold the majority of their fuse business in order to focus more on their safety switches and other safety products; advertisements with the tagline "Jones is Dead!" directed public attention to the lethal hazard of exposed electrical switches in factories. Square D hoped to capitalize on the growing concern of factory safety.

By 1929, Square D merged with a Milwaukee-based industrial controller company and began producing Westinghouse-licensed circuit breakers. In 1935 Square D began producing its own range of circuit breakers for both commercial and residential uses.

In 1991, the company was acquired and became a subsidiary of Schneider Electric.  In 2003, the Square D by Schneider Electric brand celebrated its 100th anniversary.

Today the company produces several lines of circuit breakers for domestic, commercial, and industrial applications.

Gallery

References

External links 

 Square D products at Schneider Electric

Electrical wiring and construction supplies manufacturers
Companies based in Essex County, Massachusetts
History of Detroit
American companies established in 1902
Electronics companies established in 1902
Schneider Electric
1991 mergers and acquisitions
1917 establishments in Michigan